Shane Alan McEntee (19 December 1956 – 21 December 2012) was an Irish Fine Gael politician who served as Minister of State at the Department of Agriculture, Food and the Marine from 2011 to 2012. He served as a Teachta Dála (TD) from 2005 to 2012.

Early life and family 
McEntee was born in the village of Nobber in County Meath. He had seven siblings. His father Tony died in March 2011 at the age of 86, while his mother Madge outlived him.

He became an active member of Fine Gael when he joined the party at the age of 15. Before being elected, he worked as a farmer and agricultural sales representative. He ran the "Dee Local Bar".

McEntee was also very involved in the GAA, both as trainer and player (until an injury ended his promising career). He played at the back with Nobber, and won the 1983 Feis Cup, managed the Meath minor team during the 1990s, and led three clubs (Ballinlough, Syddan, and Castletown) to finals of the Meath Intermediate Football Championship, with two wins from the three. His brother Gerry is a renowned surgeon, who won the All-Ireland Senior Football Championship with Meath in 1987 and 1988. Another brother, Andy went on to manage Meath, while Andy's son Shane also played for Meath, both after the death of their brother and uncle respectively.

He was married with two daughters and a son. His daughter Helen succeeded him as TD for Meath East after his death.

Politics 
A close friend of Taoiseach Enda Kenny, McEntee's election candidacy began in 2004 when he was selected as the Fine Gael candidate in the Meath by-election, which was triggered by the resignation from the Dáil of former leader Fine Gael, John Bruton. Polling was on 11 March 2005, and McEntee narrowly beat the Fianna Fáil candidate Shane Cassells, and was elected to the 29th Dáil.

McEntee was re-elected at the 2007 and 2011 general elections. He was the Fine Gael deputy spokesperson on Agriculture, Fisheries and Food with special responsibility for Food and Fisheries from 2007 to 2011. McEntee gave an impassioned speech in defence of party leader Enda Kenny during the 2010 Fine Gael leadership challenge. McEntee was also a successful campaigner on behalf of families in counties Dublin, Meath and Kildare whose homes had been damaged by pyrite in stone used in the foundations.

On 10 March 2011, he was appointed as the Minister of State at the Department of Agriculture, Food and the Marine with responsibility for Food, Horticulture and Food Safety.

Death 
McEntee died by suicide on 21 December 2012, two days after his 56th birthday. McEntee had been feeling under pressure because of criticism of a number of Government budgetary decisions. His funeral took place on 24 December 2012.

The by-election for his seat was held on 27 March 2013, and was won by his daughter Helen.

References 

1956 births
2012 deaths
Fine Gael TDs
Gaelic games players from County Meath
Gaelic football backs
Gaelic football managers
Irish businesspeople
Irish farmers
Irish politicians who committed suicide
Shane
Members of the 29th Dáil
Members of the 30th Dáil
Members of the 31st Dáil
Ministers of State of the 31st Dáil
Nobber Gaelic footballers
Politicians from County Meath
Suicides in the Republic of Ireland